Gregory or Greg Lake may refer to:
 Greg Lake (1947–2016), English musician,  member of the band King Crimson and the trio Emerson, Lake, and Palmer
 Greg Lake (album), a 1981 debut studio album by Greg Lake
 Greg Lake (radio personality) (born 1960), Florida radio personality
 Greg Lake, a personality on Geordie Shore (series 1)
 Gregory Lake (La Jacques-Cartier), Quebec, Canada

See also
 Lake Gregory (disambiguation), a list of lakes
 Gregg Lake, Alberta, Canada